Single track may refer to:

Road, track or railway only wide enough for one vehicle at a time. See:
Single-track railway
Single-track road
Singletrack (mountain biking)
Trail
Single-track vehicles, such as:
Bicycles
Motorcycles
Monoskies
Single (music) - a single piece of music released by an artist
The Single Track, a 1921 American film directed by Webster Campbell